Barry County is a county in the U.S. state of Michigan. As of the 2020 United States Census, the population was 62,423. The county seat is Hastings.

History
Before the present era, the Michigan peninsula was long occupied by bands of the Potowatomi and Ojibwe of the Lake Superior Band of Chippewa Indians. The United States government forced the tribes to cede their extensive territories to the federal government, in exchange for annuities and small reservations. The federally recognized Match-E-Be-Nash-She-Wish Band of Pottowatomi has a reservation in Allegan County, just west of Barry County.

Barry County was described and delineated by act of the Territorial legislature on April 29, 1829, carved out of previously unorganized lands in the Territory. It was named to honor William Taylor Barry, who was serving as United States Postmaster General at the time of the county's proclamation. Barry was one of US President Andrew Jackson's cabinet members who were memorialized in names of ten Michigan counties, the "cabinet counties".

By 1839, the Territory had been admitted into the Union as Michigan State. In 1839, the Michigan State Legislature approved the organization of Barry County as an independent entity.

In the early years of the twentieth century, petroleum deposits of varying magnitudes were discovered and developed in Michigan's Lower Peninsula. This discovery was made in Barry County in 1939; similar discoveries in adjacent counties ranged from 1937 (Allegan County) to 1972 (Eaton County). Identifiable petroleum deposits had been identified in every county adjacent to Barry by 1972.

Geography

Adjacent counties

 Ionia County – northeast
 Eaton County – east
 Calhoun County – southeast
 Kalamazoo County – southwest
 Allegan County – west
 Kent County – northwest

Transportation

Major highways
  – enters NW part of county running south from Kent County. Runs S and SE to Hastings; runs south and SSE from Hastings to Calhoun County.
  – enters from Kalamazoo. Runs north and east through Delton, Hastings and Carlton to intersection with M43, east of Woodland in NE corner of Barry County.
  – enters NE tip of county at Woodbury. Runs west and north to Ionia County.
  – enters SE corner of county running N from Calhoun County. Runs north and NE through eastern portion of county. Passes Nashville to NE corner of county; exits to Eaton County at Woodbury running east.
  – runs SW across extreme southeastern tip of county, entering from Eaton County, exiting to Calhoun County.
  – runs west from its intersection with M66 at Nashville to its intersection with M37, SE of Hastings.
  – runs SE across the southwestern tip of county, from Allegan County to Kalamazoo County.
  – enters west portion of county from Allegan County. Runs east to Hastings.

Railroads
There were once several minor railroads through the county; at present, there are none. The only railroad left in the county is a two-mile section owned by CSX Transportation, running through the northeastern corner of Woodland Township.

Demographics

As of the 2010 United States Census, there were 59,173 people living in the county. 96.9% were White, 0.5% Native American, 0.4% Black or African American, 0.4% Asian, 0.6% of some other race and 1.3% of two or more races. 2.3% were Hispanic or Latino (of any race). 19.8% were of German, 13.5% American, 12.1% English, 11.2% Dutch and 8.1% Irish ancestry.

As of the 2000 United States Census, there were 56,755 people, 21,035 households, and 15,986 families living in the county. There were 23,876 housing units at an average density of 43 per square mile (17/km2). The racial makeup of the county was 97.39% White, 0.24% African American, 0.46% Native American, 0.27% Asian, 0.01% Pacific Islander, 0.50% from other races, and 1.12% from two or more races. 1.46% of the population were Hispanic or Latino of any race. 21.8% were of German, 13.6% English, 12.5% Dutch, 12.4% American and 9.6% Irish ancestry according to Census 2000. 98.2% spoke only English at home.

There were 21,035 households, out of which 35.20% had children under the age of 18 living with them, 64.10% were married couples living together, 7.70% had a female householder with no husband present, and 24.00% were non-families. 19.50% of all households were made up of individuals, and 7.70% had someone living alone who was 65 years of age or older. The average household size was 2.68 and the average family size was 3.06.

The county population contained 27.20% under the age of 18, 7.50% from 18 to 24, 29.00% from 25 to 44, 24.60% from 45 to 64, and 11.80% who were 65 years of age or older. The median age was 37 years. For every 100 females, there were 99.70 males. For every 100 females age 18 and over, there were 98.80 males.

The median income for a household in the county was $46,820, and the median income for a family was $51,794. Males had a median income of $38,991 versus $26,387 for females. The per capita income for the county was $20,636. About 3.90% of families and 5.50% of the population were below the poverty line, including 5.90% of those under age 18 and 5.90% of those age 65 or over.

Government

Elections
Barry County has been strongly Republican from its start. Since 1884, the Republican Party nominee has carried the county vote in 91% of the elections (31 of 34 elections).

The county government operates the jail, maintains rural roads, operates the major local courts, records deeds, mortgages, and vital records, administers public health regulations, and participates with the state in the provision of social services. The county board of commissioners controls the budget, and has limited authority to make laws or ordinances. In Michigan, most local government functions—police and fire, building and zoning, tax assessment, street maintenance, etc.—are the responsibility of individual cities and townships.

Elected officials

 Prosecuting Attorney: Julie Nakfoor-Pratt
 Sheriff: Dar Leaf
 County Clerk: Pam Palmer
 County Treasurer: Susan L. Vandecar
 Register of Deeds: Barbara D. Hurless
 Drain Commissioner: James Dull
 County Surveyor: Brian Reynolds
 County Board of Commissioners: 7 Members (7 Republicans, 0 Democrats)

(information )

In an October 2020 interview with Fox 17 News, Sheriff Dar Leaf stated that the individuals charged in a plot to kidnap Governor Gretchen Whitmer may have been attempting to effectuate a lawful arrest on Whitmer as opposed to a kidnapping. The Sheriff had shared a stage with one of those charged at a protest of the Governor's stay-at-home order in May.

Education
Public schools in Barry County:
 Hastings – 7 public schools, 2 private schools, 1 community college (extension of Kellogg Community College) (see Hastings, Michigan)
 Delton – 3 public schools, 3 private schools (see Delton, Michigan)
 Middleville – 5 public schools (see Middleville, Michigan)

Sports
Barry County is the host of the annual Barry-Roubaix cycling race.

Arts and Culture 
The annual Barry County Artists Exhibition highlights local art each summer.

Communities

City
 Hastings (county seat)

Villages
 Freeport
 Middleville
 Nashville
 Woodland

Census-Designated Places
 Delton
 Dowling
 Hickory Corners

Unincorporated communities
 Assyria
 Banfield
 Cloverdale
 Coats Grove
 Lacey
 Maple Grove
 Prairieville
 Quimby
 Schultz

Townships
 Assyria Township
 Baltimore Township
 Barry Township
 Carlton Township
 Castleton Township
 Hastings Charter Township
 Hope Township
 Irving Township
 Johnstown Township
 Maple Grove Township
 Orangeville Township
 Prairieville Township
 Rutland Charter Township
 Thornapple Township
 Woodland Township
 Yankee Springs Township

See also
 List of Michigan State Historic Sites in Barry County, Michigan
 National Register of Historic Places listings in Barry County, Michigan
List of counties in Michigan

References

External links
 Official Website of Barry County, Michigan
 
 Barry County, MI GenWeb. Many history and genealogy pages

 
Michigan counties
Grand Rapids metropolitan area
1839 establishments in Michigan
Populated places established in 1839